Amauromyces is a fungal genus in the family Meruliaceae. It is a monotypic genus, containing the single species Amauromyces pallidus.

External links
Amauromyces at Index Fungorum

Fungi described in 1978
Meruliaceae
Monotypic Polyporales genera